Sir Charles Gregory Wade KCMG, KC, JP (26 January 1863 – 26 September 1922) was Premier of New South Wales  – 21 October 1910. According to Percival Serle, "Wade was a public-spirited man of high character. His ability, honesty and courage were quickly recognized and, though he could not be called a great leader, he was either in office or leader of the opposition for nearly the whole of his political life of 14 years. His career as a judge was short, but his sense of justice and grasp of principles and details, eminently fitted him for that position."

Early years
Charles Gregory Wade was born in Singleton, New South Wales. He was the son of William Burton Wade, a civil engineer. Educated at All Saints College, Bathurst, and The King's School, Parramatta. Wade won the Broughton and Forrest scholarships and went to Merton College, Oxford. He had a distinguished career, both as a scholar and an athlete, graduating as Bachelor of Arts (B.A.) with honours in classics in 1884 and representing his university and, eight times, England at rugby union (for example, he played for England in the first Home Championship, becoming first to score a hat-trick of tries when playing against Wales). He played county cricket for Herefordshire and Shropshire between 1881 and 1884, and also excelled at lawn tennis, rowing and target shooting.

He was called to the bar at the Inner Temple in 1886 and in the same year returned to Sydney. He married Ella Louise Bell, daughter of a civil engineer, in 1890. He made a reputation as a barrister and was appointed a crown prosecutor in 1891 and successfully prosecuted George Dean for attempted murder in a notorious case in 1895. He was an acting Judge of the District Court between 1896 and 1902. From 1902, he represented employers before the new Industrial Arbitration Court.

Political career
In September 1903, he ran successfully for the Legislative Assembly seat of Willoughby, with the support of the Liberal and Reform Association, People's Reform League, New South Wales Alliance for the Suppression of Intemperance, Loyal Orange Institution and Australian Protestant Defence Association. From 1904 to 1917, he represented Gordon. 

Within a year of his first election he joined the Carruthers ministry as Attorney-General and Minister for Justice. When Carruthers resigned Wade became Premier on 2 October 1907, but still retained his previous portfolios. He was an energetic leader and a large number of acts were passed by his government dealing with among others, industrial disputes, neglected children, minimum wage, employers' liability, the liquor problem, and closer settlement. There was some remission of taxation and each year the treasurer was able to show a surplus. The great Burrinjuck Dam for which the Carruthers government was responsible was started, and special care was taken that the consequent increase in the value of the land should be preserved for the people generally and not merely the landholders. 

During the 1909–10 coal strike, Wade appeared to favour the mine-owners and lost significant community support.

In spite of his good record Wade was defeated at the general election, and a Labour government came in on 21 October 1910, Wade becoming leader of the opposition. In November 1916 there was a split in the Labor party on the issue of conscription, with premier William Holman and 17 other pro-conscription Labor MPs were expelled from the party on the issue, and formed a grand coalition with Liberal Reform, giving the coalition a majority in parliament, with Holman remaining Premier. 

Wade was prominent in the negotiations for a coalition, but the state of his health did not allow him to seek office. He thus had no role when Liberal Reform merged with Holman's pro-conscription ex-Labor MPs a few months later to form the New South Wales branch of the Nationalist Party of Australia, though the new party was dominated by Liberal Reformers. He also declined the office of Agent-General for New South Wales but went to London on holiday. A few months later, finding his health much improved, he became agent-general. 

A series of seven lectures on Australia delivered at University College, London, was published in 1919 under the title Australia, Problems and Prospects. In December of that year Wade was appointed a judge of the Supreme Court of New South Wales at Sydney and took up his duties in March 1920.

His funeral was held at St. Andrew's Cathedral, Sydney on 22 September 1922. He was buried at South Head General Cemetery on the same day.

Honours
Wade became a King's Counsel on 6 March 1905, was knighted in 1918, and was created KCMG on 5 June 1920.

See also 
List of Six Nations Championship hat-tricks

References

 

1863 births
1922 deaths
Alumni of Merton College, Oxford
Attorneys General of New South Wales
Australian barristers
Agents-General for New South Wales
Australian Knights Bachelor
Australian Knights Commander of the Order of St Michael and St George
Australian politicians awarded knighthoods
Australian King's Counsel
Australian rugby union players
Oxford University RFC players
England international rugby union players
Judges of the Supreme Court of New South Wales
Judges of the District Court of NSW
19th-century Australian judges
20th-century Australian judges
Leaders of the Opposition in New South Wales
Members of the Inner Temple
Members of the New South Wales Legislative Assembly
Premiers of New South Wales
20th-century King's Counsel